Rufus A. Lewis (November 30, 1906 – August 19, 1999) was an American civil rights activist and politician.

Life and family
Rufus Andrew Lewis was born in Montgomery, Alabama on November 30, 1906. He was the fourth and last child of Lula and Jerry Lewis. He had three older sisters: Roberta, Janie, and Corrine. Lewis married in 1935 to Jule Adelaide Clayton, daughter of Mr. and Mrs. William and Frazzie Clayton. They had one child, a daughter, Mrs. Eleanor Lewis Dawkins. The family lived on Bolivar Street in Montgomery, Alabama at the home of William Clayton following his passing. The street has since been renamed Rufus A. Lewis Ln and the family home is now the residence of Lewis' granddaughter, Ms. Karen Dawkins. Jule Clayton Lewis passed away in 1958 following a car accident.

Education 
Lewis received his early education in Montgomery County where no public high school program was available to black children at the time. As a teenager, he attended Alabama State Laboratory High School, a tuition-funded private school with limited capacity that was used by Alabama State College to train teachers. He then went on to attend the Alabama State Teachers’ Junior College. Lewis was involved in athletics at the high school and college level, participating in both football and baseball. After junior college, he moved to Nashville, Tennessee to attend University. Lewis graduated from Fisk University in 1931 with a degree in Business Administration.

Career 
Rufus Lewis returned to Alabama after graduating where he taught for one year at the Conecuh County Training School in Evergreen, Alabama (1931-1932) and then at People's Village School in Mt. Meigs, Alabama (1932-1933). In 1933 Rufus Lewis became a faculty member at Alabama State Teachers College where he worked as the athletic coach and librarian. In 1943, Lewis, a charter member of the graduate chapter of Alpha Upsilon Lambda chapter of Alpha Phi Alpha Fraternity, was named the Head Coach for Football and Track. He worked as a football coach there until the outbreak of World War II in 1941. Although he was called to serve in the war, a prior injury resulting from a car accident made him ineligible. He went on to spend two years working with the National Defense Project as a civilian. After the war ended, Lewis established classes for black Montgomery residents who wanted to pass the literacy tests they were required to complete to vote.

Activism 
Lewis first became active in the voter registration movement in 1938 when he went to work with students in the “Citizenship Club” at Alabama State Laboratory High School. During the early 40s, Lewis set up schools and clinics to teach community members, especially veterans, to fill out the required literacy test to become a registered voter. In 1949 Lewis was hired to lead a program created by the Montgomery School Board in an agreement with the Veterans Administration that offered job training classes for black veterans. In 1952 Lewis founded the Citizens Club, a social club aimed to assist the black community with matters of voter registration. In 1954 Lewis worked with Jo Ann Robinson and E. D. Nixon to organize the Citizen Coordinating Committee to advance efforts in civic consciousness and get people registered to vote.

He was a member of Dexter Avenue Baptist Church and a founding member of the Montgomery Improvement Association which organized the Montgomery bus boycott. He served on the organization's executive committee and was chairman of the transportation committee and the voter registration committee. At the organization's first meeting, Lewis nominated Martin Luther King Jr. as president.

Political work 
Lewis’ early work as a civil rights activist lead to a successful political career later in life. In 1960 he co-founded the Alabama Democratic Conference (ADC). Lewis was the first president of the Montgomery County Democratic Conference, 2nd Congressional District of the Democratic Conference. He was appointed to the Board of Directors of the Montgomery Community Action Committee. He later attended the official signing of the Voting Rights Act of 1965 at the White House. In 1976, he was elected to the Alabama House of Representatives. In 1977  President Jimmy Carter appointed Lewis to become the first Black U.S. Marshal of the Middle District of Alabama. He worked in this role until 1981.

Honors and awards
In 1994, one of Montgomery's libraries was renamed Rufus A. Lewis Regional Library in his honor. The street that he and his wife lived on for many years was also changed from Bolivar Lane to Rufus A. Lewis Lane.

Head coaching record

References

External links
 

1906 births
1999 deaths
20th-century African-American politicians
20th-century American politicians
20th-century African-American sportspeople
Activists from Montgomery, Alabama
Activists for African-American civil rights
Alabama State Hornets football coaches
Coaches of American football from Alabama
Fisk University alumni
Democratic Party members of the Alabama House of Representatives
Politicians from Montgomery, Alabama
Sportspeople from Montgomery, Alabama
United States Marshals